Avola is a city and comune in the province of Syracuse, Sicily.

Avola may also refer to:
 
 Ribolla Gialla, also known as Avola, an Italian/Slovenian wine grape
 Avola, British Columbia, an unincorporated community in the Canadian province of British Columbia
 Giorgio Avola (born 1989), Italian fencer
 Nero d'Avola, a red wine grape in Sicily